is a passenger railway station located in Aoba-ku, Yokohama, Kanagawa Prefecture, Japan, operated by the private railway company Tokyu Corporation.

Lines

Station layout 
The station consists of two opposed side platforms serving two tracks.

Platforms

History 
Tama Plaza Station was opened on April 1, 1966. The station building was extensively remodeled in 2006 by the American firm Laguarda.Low Architects.

Passenger statistics
In fiscal 2019, the station was used by an average of 59,624 passengers daily. 

The passenger figures for previous years are as shown below.

Surrounding area
Tokyu Department Store Tama Plaza
Kokugakuin University Tamaplaza Campus
Kanagawa Prefectural Motoishikawa High School

See also
 List of railway stations in Japan

References

External links

 

Railway stations in Kanagawa Prefecture
Railway stations in Japan opened in 1966
Railway stations in Yokohama